Jenny Erpenbeck (born 12 March 1967) is a German writer and opera director, recipient of the Independent Foreign Fiction Prize.

Life
Born in East Berlin, Erpenbeck is the daughter of the physicist, philosopher and writer John Erpenbeck and the Arabic translator Doris Kilias. Her grandparents are the authors Fritz Erpenbeck and Hedda Zinner. In Berlin she attended an Advanced High School, where she graduated in 1985.  She then completed a two-year apprenticeship as a bookbinder before working at several theaters as props and wardrobe supervisor.

From 1988 to 1990 Erpenbeck studied theatre at the Humboldt University of Berlin.  In 1990 she changed her studies to Music Theater Director (studying with, among others, Ruth Berghaus, Heiner Müller and Peter Konwitschny) at the Hanns Eisler Music Conservatory. After the successful completion of her studies in 1994, with a production of Béla Bartók's opera Duke Bluebeard's Castle in her parish church and in the Kunsthaus Tacheles, she spent some time at first as an assistant director at the opera house in Graz, where in 1997 she did her own productions of Schoenberg's Erwartung, Bartók's Duke Bluebeard's Castle and a world premiere of her own piece Cats Have Seven Lives.   As a freelance director, she directed in 1998 different opera houses in Germany and Austria, including Monteverdi's L'Orfeo in Aachen, Acis and Galatea at the Berlin State Opera and Wolfgang Amadeus Mozart's Zaide in Nuremberg/Erlangen.

In the 1990s Erpenbeck started a writing career in addition to her directing. She is author of narrative prose and plays: her debut novella in 1999, Geschichte vom alten Kind (The Old Child); in 2001, her collection of stories Tand (Trinkets); in 2004, the novella Wörterbuch (The Book of Words); and in 2008, the novel Heimsuchung (Visitation). In 2007, Erpenbeck took over a biweekly column by Nicole Krauss in the Frankfurter Allgemeine Zeitung. In 2015 the English translation of her novel Aller Tage Abend (The End of Days) won the Independent Foreign Fiction Prize.

Erpenbeck's works have been translated into Danish, English, French, Greek, Hebrew, Dutch, Swedish, Slovene, Spanish, Hungarian, Japanese, Korean, Lithuanian, Norwegian, Polish, Portuguese, Romanian, Arabic, Estonian and Finnish.

Erpenbeck lives in Berlin with her husband, conductor Wolfgang Bozic, and her son.

Works

Novels 
Heimsuchung (2008). Visitation, trans. Susan Bernofsky (New Directions, 2010; Portobello, 2011).
Aller Tage Abend (2012). The End of Days, trans. Susan Bernofsky (New Directions, 2014; Portobello, 2015).
 Gehen, ging, gegangen (2015). Go, Went, Gone, trans. Susan Bernofsky (New Directions/Portobello, 2017).
Kairos (2021). Trans. Michael Hofmann (Granta/New Directions, 2023).

Novellas and short story collections 

Geschichte vom alten Kind (1999). The Old Child, trans. Susan Bernofsky.
Published with five stories from Tand as The Old Child and Other Stories (New Directions, 2005), and in The Old Child and The Book of Words (Portobello, 2008).
Tand (2001). Trinkets. Short stories.
 Wörterbuch (2004). The Book of Words, trans. Susan Bernofsky (New Directions/Portobello, 2007), and in The Old Child and The Book of Words (Portobello, 2008).

Plays
 Katzen haben sieben Leben (2000). Cats Have Seven Lives.
 Leibesübungen für eine Sünderin (2003). Physical Exercises for a Sinner.
Schmutzige Nacht (2015)
Lot (2017)

Other 

Dinge, die verschwinden (2009). Things That Are Disappearing.
 Kein Roman: Texte 1992 bis 2018 (2018). Not a Novel: A Memoir in Pieces, trans. Kurt Beals (New Directions/Granta, 2020).

Audiobooks 
 2016: Heimsuchung (Novel, read by Jenny Erpenbeck), publisher: der Hörverlag, (Audiobook-Download)
 2021: Kairos (Novel, read by Jenny Erpenbeck), publisher: der Hörverlag, (Audiobook-Download)

Awards and honors
 2001 Jury Prize at the Ingeborg Bachmann Competition in Klagenfurt
 2001 Several residencies (Ledig Rowohlt House in New York, Künstlerhaus Schloss Wiepersdorf)
 2004 GEDOK literature prize
 2006 Winner of the Scholarship Island Writers on Sylt
 2008 Solothurner Literaturpreis
 2008 Heimito von Doderer Literature Prize
 2008 Hertha-Koenig-Literature Prize
 2009 Award of the North LiteraTour
 2010 Literature Prize of the Steel Foundation Eisenhüttenstadt
 2011 Jewish Quarterly-Wingate Prize, shortlisted for Visitation
 2013 Joseph Breitbach Prize
 2014 Hans Fallada Prize
 2015 Independent Foreign Fiction Prize, winner for The End of Days (prize shared with the book's translator, Susan Bernofsky)
 2016 International Dublin Literary Award, shortlisted for The End of Days
 2016 Thomas Mann Prize
 2017 Strega European Prize
 2017 Order of Merit of the Federal Republic of Germany
 2018 Go, Went, Gone New York Times Notable Book List 2018
 2019 The Guardian ranked Visitation #90 in its list of 100 Best Books of the 21st Century.
 2022 Uwe Johnson Prize for Kairos

Further reading
 Bartel, Heike and Elizabeth Boa (eds.) Pushing at Boundaries: Approaches to Contemporary German Women Writers from Karen Duve to Jenny Erpenbeck. Amsterdam: Rodopi, 2006. . Amsterdam
 Wiebke, Eden. "To Express with Words, was Always the Next," in No Fear of Big Emotions. Frankfurt am Main: Fischer-Taschenbuch-Verlag, 2003. , pp. 13–32 (Jenny Erpenbeck interview)

References

Living people
1967 births
German women writers
People from East Berlin
Recipients of the Cross of the Order of Merit of the Federal Republic of Germany
20th-century German women